Group A of the 2008 Fed Cup Asia/Oceania Zone Group II was one of two pools in the Asia/Oceania Zone Group II of the 2008 Fed Cup. Three teams competed in a round robin competition, with the teams proceeding to their respective sections of the play-offs: the top team played for advancement to the 2009 Group I.

South Korea vs. Syria

Philippines vs. Syria

South Korea vs. Philippines

See also
Fed Cup structure

References

External links
 Fed Cup website

2008 Fed Cup Asia/Oceania Zone